Li Xiangyu (born 21 October 1985 in Shuangyashan, Heilongjiang) is a Chinese middle distance runner who specializes in the 800 metres.

He finished ninth at the 2005 Summer Universiade. He also won the 2005 National Games and the 2006 National Championships. He represented his country at the 2008 Summer Olympics. Li retained his National Games title with a win in the 800 m at the 11th National Games in 2009.

His personal best time is 1:46.45 minutes, achieved in July 2006 in Lignano Sabbiadoro.

References
 
 Team China 2008

1985 births
Living people
Athletes (track and field) at the 2008 Summer Olympics
Chinese male middle-distance runners
Olympic athletes of China
People from Shuangyashan
Runners from Heilongjiang
Competitors at the 2005 Summer Universiade